Douglas C. Noll is an American bioengineer currently the Ann and Robert H. Lurie Professor of Bioengineering at University of Michigan, where he also is professor of radiology and co-director of the Functional MRI Laboratory.    

He graduated from Bucknell University (B.S., 1985)  and did graduate work at Stanford University, where he earned an M.S. (1986) and  Ph.D. (1991) in electrical engineering. 

Prior to working at the University of Michigan he worked at the University of Illinois, Carnegie Mellon University and University of Pittsburgh.  

He is an Elected Fellow of the American Institute for Medical and Biological Engineering, International Society of Magnetic Resonance in Medicine and Biomedical Engineering Society.

References

20th-century births
Living people
Bucknell University alumni
Stanford University alumni
Carnegie Mellon University faculty
University of Illinois faculty
University of Michigan faculty
University of Pittsburgh faculty
21st-century American engineers
Fellows of the American Institute for Medical and Biological Engineering
Fellows of the Biomedical Engineering Society
Year of birth missing (living people)

Biomedical engineers